The Bravest Revenge, also known as Wu lin long hu dou, is a 1970 Hong Kong action martial arts film directed by Lung Chien, produced by L.S. Chang, and starring Polly Ling-Feng Shang-Kuan, Peng Tien and Yuan Yi.

Plot 

Polly's father is murdered, and it's duty for her, her brothers and the King of Sword to revenge him.

Cast

 Polly Shang-Kuan as Shi Fang Yi
 Tien Peng as Cai Ying Jie
 Yi Yuan as Chao Mu Tien
 Ma Chi as Shi Yu Long
 Wan Chung Shan as Zhu Yi Feng
 Hsieh Han as Shan Fei
 Kao Ming
 Huang Chun
 Shao Lo Hui

References

External links

1970 films
1970 martial arts films
1970s action films
1970s martial arts films
1970s Cantonese-language films
Films set in Shanghai
Films shot in Hong Kong
Hong Kong action films
Hong Kong films about revenge
Hong Kong martial arts films
Kung fu films
1970s Mandarin-language films
Films directed by Lung Chien
1970s Hong Kong films